Patedhi Belsar ( in Hindi : पटेढ़ी बेलसर ) is a region in the Vaishali District and Bihar State. According to census website, the nomenclature of all regions in the Bihar State is done via C.D. Blocks. ( Community Development Blocks).

Block  office

Number of Panchayat: 9
Number  of Vil

Panchayat

 Belsar
 Sorhattha
 Sain
 Nagwan
 Misroliya Afjalpur
 Manora
 Chakgulamuddin
 Jaran Rampur
 Karneji

Demographics
The population is 74,461, including 36423 females and 38038 males for a sex ratio of 958. 17,464 are members of Scheduled Castes. Minorities make up 6940.

Public distribution system
Many residents receive public benefits:

Number of HHS : 12392
BPL Card Holders : 11568
Antodaya Card Holders : 2232
Annapurna Card Holders : 301
APL : 9167
Number of Fair Price Shops: 40

Education
The literacy rate  47.9% (2001 ist.) The male literacy rate is 60.9% and the female literacy rate  34.5%.

Schools
The area supports 43 primary schools (2009 est.) and 37 upper primary schools.

References 

Community development blocks in Vaishali district